Pukhrayan is a town and a Municipality in Kanpur Dehat district in the Indian state of Uttar Pradesh.

Geography 

Transport

Rail
Pokhrayan is main railway station of Kanpur Dehat districton Kanpur -Jhansi railway section  under North Central Railway zone   in Jhansi Division.

Pukhrayan to jhansi, Pukhrayan to Delhi, Pukhrayan to Gujarat bus service is also there

Road
Lucknow-Jhansi National High Way passes through Pukhrayan city.

Demographics 
As of 2021 India census, Pukhrayan had a population of 65,503. Males constitute 51% of the population and females 49%. Pukhrayan has an average literacy rate of 88%, higher than the national average of 59.5%: male literacy is 85%, and female literacy is 77%. In Pukhrayan, 20% of the population is under 6 years of age.

Education 
RSGU Post Graduate College Pukhrayan
RSGU Inter college Pukhrayan
GGI college Pukhrayan
Vivekanand Rashtriya Inter College
Prema Katiyar Shikshan Sansthaan
Shivwati Shivanandan Shukla Mahavidyalay 
BKSD Global School
Funkids Pre School
Rajrani Dulichand School
National Inter College

References

Cities and towns in Kanpur Dehat district